Martin Kilduff is a British academic. He is the Professor of Management at the UCL School of Management.

Early life
Martin Kilduff grew up in the Camden Town area of London, England. He attended Primrose Hill primary school followed by Quintin grammar school. His higher education was pursued in the U.S. He received his BA and MBA from Washington State University and his MS and PhD from Cornell University.

Career
Kilduff was an assistant professor of Organizational Behavior at INSEAD, professor of management at Pennsylvania State University, the Kleberg/King Ranch Centennial Professor of Management at the University of Texas at Austin, and the Diageo Professor of Management Studies at the University of Cambridge. He is a professor of management at the UCL School of Management.

Kilduff was editor of Academy of Management Review and associate editor of Administrative Science Quarterly. Currently he is Division Chair of the Organization and Management Theory Division of the Academy of Management. His research focuses on social networks and includes the co-authored books Social Networks and Organizations (Sage: 2003); and Interpersonal networks in organizations: Cognition, personality, dynamics and culture (Cambridge University Press: 2008). His research relates personality to network structure (e.g., Journal of Applied Psychology, 2008), perceived networks to actual networks (e.g., Organizational Behavior and Human Decision Processes, 2008), and proposes new theory concerning scientific innovation (e.g., Academy of Management Review, 2011).

Works
Journal Articles

Burt, R. S., Kilduff, M., Tasselli, S. Forthcoming. Social Network Analysis: Foundations and Frontiers on Advantage. Annual Review of Psychology.

Toegel, G., Kilduff, M., & Anand, N. Forthcoming. Emotion helping by managers: An emergent understanding of discrepant role expectations and outcomes. Academy of Management Journal.

Balkundi, P., Kilduff, M., & Harrison, D. A. 2011. Centrality and charisma: Comparing how leader networks and attributions affect team performance. Journal of Applied Psychology, 96: 1209–1222.

Kilduff, M., Mehra, A., & Dunn, M. 2011. From blue sky research to problem solving: A philosophy of science theory of new knowledge production. Academy of Management Review, 36: 297–317.

Kilduff, M., & Chiaburu, D.S., & Menges, J.I. 2010. Strategic use of emotional intelligence in organizational settings: Exploring the dark side. Research in Organizational Behavior, 30: 129–152.

Kilduff, M., & Brass, D. J. 2010. Organizational social network research: Core ideas and key debates. Academy of Management Annals, 4: 317–357.

Kilduff, M., & Brass, D. J. 2010. Job design: a social network perspective. Journal of Organizational Behavior, 31: 309–318.

Oh, H., & Kilduff, M. 2008.  The ripple effect of personality on social structure: Self-monitoring origins of network brokerage. Journal of Applied Psychology, 93: 1155–1164.

Kilduff, M., Crossland, C., Tsai, W., & Krackhardt, D. 2008.  Organizational network perceptions versus reality: A small world after all? Organizational Behavior and Human Decision Processes, 107: 15–28.

Toegel, G., Anand, N., & Kilduff, M. 2007. Emotion helpers: The role of high positive affectivity and high self-monitoring managers. Personnel Psychology, 60: 337–365.

Balkundi, P., Kilduff, M., Michael, J., & Barsness, Z. 2007.  Demographic antecedents and performance consequences of structural holes in work teams. Journal of Organizational Behavior, 28: 241–260.

Kilduff, M., Tsai, W., & Hanke, R. 2006. A paradigm too far? A dynamic stability reconsideration of the social network research program. Academy of Management Review, 31: 1031–1048.

Kilduff, M., & Oh, H. 2006. Deconstructing diffusion: An ethnostatistical examination of Medical Innovation network data reanalyses. Organizational Research Methods, 9: 432–455.

Balkundi, P., & Kilduff, M. 2005. The ties that lead: A social network approach to leadership. Leadership Quarterly, 16: 941–961.

Ibarra, H., Kilduff, M., & Tsai, W. 2005. Zooming in and out: Connecting individuals and collectivities at the frontiers of organizational network research. Organization Science, 16: 359–371.

Krackhardt, D., & Kilduff, M. 2002. Structure, culture and Simmelian ties in entrepreneurial firms. Social Networks, 24: 279–290.

Kilduff, M., & Kelemen, M. 2001. The consolations of organization theory. British Journal of Management: 12: S55-S59.

Mehra, A., Kilduff, M., & Brass, D. 2001. The social networks of high and low self-monitors: Implications for workplace performance. Administrative Science Quarterly, 46: 121–146.

Kilduff, M., Angelmar, R., & Mehra, A. 2000. Top management team diversity and firm performance: Examining the role of cognitions. Organization Science, 11: 21–34.

Welcomer, S.A., Gioia, D.A., & Kilduff, M. 2000. Resisting the discourse of modernity: Rationality and emotion in hazardous waste siting. Human Relations, 53: 1175–1205.

Krackhardt, D., & Kilduff, M. 1999. Whether close or far: Social distance effects on perceived balance in friendship networks. Journal of Personality and Social Psychology, 76: 770–782.

Mehra, A., Kilduff, M., & Brass, D.J. 1998. At the margins: A distinctiveness approach to the social identity and social networks of underrepresented groups. Academy of Management Journal, 41: 441–452.

Kilduff, M., Funk, J., & Mehra, A. 1997. Engineering identity in a Japanese factory. Organization Science, 8: 579–592.

Kilduff, M., & Mehra, A. 1997. Postmodernism and organizational research. Academy of Management Review, 22: 453–481.

Kilduff, M., & Day, D. 1994. Do chameleons get ahead? The effects of self-monitoring on managerial careers. Academy of Management Journal, 37: 1047-1060 (summary of this article published in Academy of Management Executive (1995), 9: 89–90).

Kilduff, M., & Krackhardt, D. 1994. Bringing the individual back in: A structural analysis of the internal market for reputation in organizations. Academy of Management Journal, 37: 87–108.

Kilduff, M. 1993. Deconstructing Organizations. Academy of Management Review, 18: 13–31.

Kilduff, M. 1992. The friendship network as a decision-making resource: Dispositional moderators of social influences on organizational choice. Journal of Personality and Social Psychology, 62: 168–80.

Kilduff, M. 1992. Performance and interaction routines in multinational corporations. Journal of International Business Studies, 23: 133–145.

Kilduff, M. 1990. The interpersonal structure of decision-making: A social comparison approach to organizational choice. Organizational Behavior and Human Decision Processes, 47: 270–288.

Krackhardt, D., & Kilduff, M. 1990. Friendship patterns and culture: The control of organizational diversity. American Anthropologist, 92: 142 154.

Kilduff, M., & Regan, D. 1988. What people say and what they do: The differential effects of informational cues and task design. Organizational Behavior and Human Decision Processes, 41: 83–97.

Abolafia, M., & Kilduff, M. 1988. Enacting market crisis: The social construction of a speculative bubble. Administrative Science Quarterly, 33: 177–193.

Regan, D., & Kilduff, M. 1988. Optimism about elections: Dissonance reduction at the ballot box. Political Psychology, 9: 101 107.

Non-Refereed Articles (editor's comments etc.):

Kilduff, M. 2007.  The top ten reasons why your paper might not be sent out for review.  Academy of Management Review. 32: 700–702.

Kilduff, M. 2006. Publishing theory.  Academy of Management Review, 31: 252–255.

Kilduff, M. 2006. Change, development, and challenge at AMR.  Academy of Management Review, 31: 8–9.

BOOK CHAPTERS

Kilduff, M., & Balkundi, P. 2011. A network approach to leader cognition and effectiveness. In A. Bryman, K. Grint, B. Jackson, & M. Uhl-Bien (Eds.), Sage Handbook of Leadership: 118–135. London: Sage.

Kilduff, M. 2008.  Using technology to improve the editorial process. In Y. Baruch, A. Konrad, H. Aguinis, & W. H. Starbuck (Eds.), Opening the black box of editorship: 97–103. London: Palgrave Macmillan.

Kilduff, M., Crossland, C., & Tsai, W. 2008.  Pathways of opportunity in dynamic organizational networks.  In M. Uhl-Bien & R. Marion (Eds.), Complexity leadership: Part 1: conceptual foundations: 83- 99. Charlotte, NC: Information Age Publishing.

Kilduff, M., & Mehra, A. 2008.  Philosophy as core competence.  In D. Barry & H. Hansen (Eds.), The Sage Handbook of new approaches in management and organization: 79–81. London: Sage.

Kilduff, M., & Kelemen, M. 2004. Deconstructing discourse. In, D. Grant, C. Hardy, C. Oswick & L. Putnam (Eds.), The Sage Handbook of organizational discourse: 259–272. London: Sage.

Day, D.V., & Kilduff, M. 2003. Self-monitoring personality and work relationships: Individual differences in social networks. In A.M. Ryan & M.R. Barrick (Eds.), Personality and work: 205–228. San Francisco: Jossey-Bass.

Kilduff, M., & Kelemen, M. 2003. Bringing ideas back in: Eclecticism and discovery in organizational studies. Research in the Sociology of Organizations, 21: 89–109.

Kilduff, M., & Corley, K. 2000. Organizational culture from a social network perspective. In N. Ashkanasy, C. Wilderom & M. Peterson (Eds.), Handbook of organizational culture and climate: 211–221. Thousand Oaks, CA: Sage.

Kilduff, M. 2000. Hegemonic masculinity and organizational behavior. In R.T. Golembiewski (Ed.), Handbook of organizational behavior, 2nd. ed.: 599–609. New York: Marcel Dekker.

Kilduff, M., & Mehra, A. 1996. Hegemonic masculinity among the elite: Power, identity, and homophily in social networks. In C. Cheng (Ed.), Masculinities in organizations: 115–129. Newbury Park, CA: Sage.

Kilduff, M. 1993. The reproduction of inertia in multinational corporations. In S. Ghoshal & E. Westney (Eds.), Organization theory and the multinational corporation: 259–274. New York: St. Martin's Press.

References 

Living people
People from the London Borough of Camden
Washington State University alumni
Cornell University alumni
Academic staff of INSEAD
Pennsylvania State University faculty
University of Texas at Austin faculty
Academics of the University of Cambridge
Academics of University College London
Year of birth missing (living people)